Chaetopsis is a genus of ulidiid or picture-winged fly in the family Ulidiidae.

Species
Chaetopsis aenea
Chaetopsis angusta
Chaetopsis apicalis
Chaetopsis debilis
Chaetopsis duplicata
Chaetopsis fulvifrons
Chaetopsis hendeli
Chaetopsis laticauda
Chaetopsis magna
Chaetopsis massyla
Chaetopsis mucronata
Chaetopsis praeceps
Chaetopsis quadrifasciata

References

 
Ulidiinae
Tephritoidea genera